The 2021 season was the 49th season in the existence of Júbilo Iwata and the club's second consecutive season in the second division of Japanese football.

Players

First-team squad
As of 14 July 2021

Out on loan

Competitions

Overall record

J2 League

League table

Results summary

Results by round

Matches

Emperor's Cup

References 

Júbilo Iwata seasons
Japanese football clubs 2021 season